The Barnard Women Poets Prize is a literary award in the United States for an English language book of poetry. From 1986 to 2001, the prize was a first-book award called the Barnard New Women Poets Prize. Winners had their poetry book published under the auspices of the award, and 16 were published from 1986 to 2001 with support from the Axe-Houghton Foundation and alumnae of Barnard College. Beacon Press was the publisher.   

A 2000 essay in the Chicago Review named this prize as one of two examples (along with the Yale Series of Younger Poets) of "first-book awards of notable integrity".  

In 2003, Women Poets at Barnard, in collaboration with W.W. Norton, inaugurated a new biennial book prize for the best second book by an American woman poet, expressing the view that "a second book more firmly establishes a poet". It is awarded by Women Poets at Barnard and the publisher W.W. Norton & Company and includes publication of the poetry book and a free public poetry reading by the author at Barnard.

Winners and judges

References

External links
 Barnard Women Poets Prize Homepage
 1986-1992 List

American poetry awards
Awards established in 1986
1986 establishments in the United States
Literary awards honoring women